Abhirami (née Divya Gopikumar; July 1983) is an Indian actress and television host. She has acted in Malayalam, Tamil, Telugu and Kannada films.

Early life and education
She was born as Divya in July 1983, to Gopikumar and Pushpa in Kerala.She attended Christ Nagar English High School and Bharatiya Vidya Bhavan, in Trivandrum and did predegree training from Mar Ivanios College, before graduating in programs for psychology and communications from the College of Wooster in Ohio.

Her family migrated to the United States in 2004 when she got a job there. Her parents are yoga instructors in Ohio.

Career 
Abhirami made her debut in director Adoor Gopalakrishnan's film Kathapurushan. While in college, Abhirami worked as a TV anchor for the program Top Ten which aired on the Asianet channel, which according to Abhirami was "quite popular" and got her a film offer. She also appeared in the 100-episode Malayalam serial Akshaya Pathram, directed by Sreekumaran Thampi. She changed her screen name to Abhirami, the character name of the heroine of the film Gunaa, being "obsessed with the role and the name".

She had a small role in the Malayalam film Pathram in 1999 and in the series Mercara directed by Jude Attipetty. Later she acted in the films Millennium Stars, Njangal Santhushtaranu, and Sradha before shifting to Tamil cinema. Her first Tamil film was Vaanavil (2001) opposite Arjun, which was a "big hit" and was followed by Middle Class Madhavan and Samudhiram. A notable film in her career was Virumaandi, in which she appeared as a Tamil village girl from Madurai opposite Kamal Haasan. Besides Tamil and Malayalam, she has appeared in Telugu and Kannada films and was a notable Tollywood actress. In 2003, she appeared opposite Upendra in the film Raktha Kanneeru and opposite Shiva Rajkumar in Sri Ram. In 2004, she retired from the film industry and settled in the United States for her studies. She went on to work as the marketing director of an MNC there.

In 2013, Abhirami was the voice of Pooja Kumar in both parts of Kamal Haasan's Vishwaroopam and she went on to host Rishimoolam, a talk show on the Tamil television channel Puthuyugam. The following year, she returned to Malayalam films with Apothecary, in which she played the role of a gynaecologist. She also appeared in Ithu Thaanda Police playing the role of Sub-Inspector Arundhati Varma.

She has also anchored the reality show Made For Each Other on Mazhavil Manorama.

Personal life
Abhirami is married to Rahul Pavanan, grandson of writer Pavanan.

Filmography

As actress

Television
 Top Ten, anchor of musical program (Asianet)
 Piyatha , telefilm (Asianet) 
 Akshaya Pathram, serial (Asianet)
 Annie , telefilm (Kairali TV)
 Rishimoolam, host (Puthuyugam)
 Made For Each Other, host (Mazhavil Manorama)
 Kanakanmani, serial (Surya TV) as Radhika (Cameo)
 Flowers Oru Kodi (Flowers TV) as Participant
 Red Carpet (Amrita TV) as Mentor

References

External links
 

20th-century Indian actresses
21st-century Indian actresses
Indian film actresses
Indian television actresses
Indian women television presenters
Indian television presenters
Living people
Actresses from Thiruvananthapuram
Actresses in Malayalam cinema
Actresses in Tamil cinema
Actresses in Telugu cinema
Actresses in Kannada cinema
Non-Malayali Keralites
Bharatiya Vidya Bhavan schools alumni
1983 births
College of Wooster alumni
Indian voice actresses
Actresses in Malayalam television